XXXX (pronounced four-ex) is a brand of Australian beer brewed in Milton, Brisbane by Queensland brewers Castlemaine Perkins (now a division of the Japanese-owned company Lion). It enjoys wide popularity in the state of Queensland, where it is commonly found on-tap in pubs and bars.
The XXXX brand was first introduced by Castlemaine in 1924 and is a throwback to the long-standing tradition of using Xs to indicate the strength of an ale. The brand name also built upon XXX Sparkling Ale introduced in 1878.

Beers
Currently sold brands include:
XXXX Bitter, a 4.4% ABV pale lager marketed under the brand XXXX.  When ordering in Queensland, it is often referred to as XXXX Heavy.
XXXX Gold, a mid strength lager - 3.5% ABV. XXXX Gold is also a lower carb beer.  When ordering in Queensland, the beer is simply referred to as Gold.
XXXX Summer Bright Lager, a full strength 4.0% ABV low carb beer. Summer Bright is also available in both lime and mango flavour.
XXXX Dry, marketed as an easy drinking full strength lager with a 4.2% ABV.

As well as these, previous beers that are no longer in mass production are occasionally available in small, limited releases at the XXXX Alehouse & Restaurant, located on the same site as the brewery. In the past, these have included:
 Thirsty Dog, a Wheat Beer popular in the 1990s.
 XXXX Draught, a less carbonated version of XXXX Bitter released in the 1970s, intended to replicate the unique taste of a beer from a wooden Barrel.
 Carbine Stout, a Stout brewed from 1915 to 2008, named after a famous racehorse from the 1890s.
 Castlemaine Best IPA, an India Pale Ale first brewed in 1918.
 In December 2019, the original XXX Sparkling Ale had a limited release in several bars across Brisbane's CBD, including at the Alehouse.

Other beers that are no longer available include:
 XXXX Light, a lower alcohol beer at 2.3% ABV.
 XXXX DL Lager, a lower carbohydrate beer which was available at 4.4% ABV.
 XXXX Gold Australian Pale Ale, at 3.5% ABV.

History
The XXXX brand was launched in 1924 by Castlemaine Brewers, named after the town of Castlemaine, Victoria where the company was founded in 1857. The yellow-and-red label still bears the town's name. XXXX has been brewed in the Castlemaine Perkins Milton Brewery since its introduction, and has featured an artist's sketch (later very stylised) of its brewery on the label of beer bottles and cans. In the 1950s the prominent 'XXXX' illuminated sign was erected on the brewery. "XXXX" itself refers to a traditional grading system for strong beer.

In 1992, Castlemaine Perkins was acquired by Australian beverage and food company Lion Nathan, who in turn were taken over by Japanese beverage conglomerate Kirin in 2009.

In March 2016, XXXX Bitter was reduced from 4.6% to 4.4% alcohol by volume (ABV).

Distribution

XXXX was brewed under licence in the UK by InBev Ltd until 2009. It was commonly available in cans in British off licences and sometimes on tap in British pubs. At 3.7% alcohol, the British brewed XXXX was somewhat weaker than most of the Australian variants. Castlemaine XXXX was withdrawn from the UK at the end of June 2009 when InBev's licensing agreement expired.

Iconography, advertising and brand recognition

XXXX's mascot is Mr Fourex - a jovial cartoon man in a suit with a boater hat, who features on the City side of the Fourex Brewery at Milton. Mr Fourex is said to be modelled after Paddy Fitzgerald, a former director of the company, however Mr Fourex had been conceived in 1924, and Fitzgerald started with XXXX only in circa 1933. A second theory is that the cartoon is modelled on a well-known dwarf who sold newspapers in the inner city suburb of Fortitude Valley in the late 1920s. The true identity for the inspiration behind the cartoon remains a mystery.

A common nickname used by the military (Australian, passed along to their Allied guests) was "Barbed Wire,"  as the XXXX has the appearance of the fence product used in the Outback.

The second major campaign was launched in the early 1980s in the North Queensland area after the general manager of 'XXXX' Pat Holmboe at the time heard of the locally famous Clinton Howe, a council road worker, being able to consume a very high quantity of the beer in a short time (approx. 3L in 1 minute or 3/4 gal.). The company was forced to close the campaign within the first few days of T.V. advertising following government pressure.

An advertisement campaign from the 1980s and 1990s featured the tagline "Australians wouldn't give a XXXX for anything else."

Most beers under the XXXX label are sold in Australia as 375 ml cans (tinnies), 375 ml bottles (stubbies) and 750 ml bottles (tallies or long necks), on tap (in most Queensland pubs but also to a lesser extent throughout the rest of Australia) and all bottles have twist top lids.  Underneath the twist top lids there are trivia questions.

XXXX is still being served from wooden barrels at the Breakfast Creek Hotel in Newstead, Queensland. Whilst not cask-conditioned, as in the case of British real ale, the beer is unpasteurised and delivered by gravity.

In Terry Pratchett's Discworld series of fantasy novels, an Australian-like continent is named XXXX, pronounced "fourecks".

XXXX's labels generally feature a depiction of the Milton Brewery alongside the Ipswich railway line, presently with a Queensland Rail EMU in the foreground with the existing extensive railway fencing omitted. Prior labels had steam engines and diesels when those locomotives were more regularly seen in Brisbane.

Sports sponsorship & Campaigns

XXXX is the major sponsor of the Queensland Maroons in the rugby league State of Origin series.  XXXX Gold is also a sponsor of the Queensland Bulls and the QLD, SA, ACT & NT Cricket Associations. XXXX Gold also sponsors the Australian V8 Supercars Championship Series as well as the Professional Bull Riders' (PBR) Australian branch.

XXXX sponsored the XXXX Gold Beach Cricket Tri-Nations 2007 series.  It involved famous cricketers from Australia such as Allan Border, England including Graham Gooch and West Indies including Courtney Walsh and Sir Viv Richards.
 
From 2012 to 2015, XXXX GOLD had a three-year lease on the 15-acre Pumpkin Island on the Southern Great Barrier Reef, which they turned into XXXX Island to use in advertising and promotional events.

See also

Australian pub
Beer in Australia
List of breweries in Australia

References

External links

 
 XXXX Island Website
XXXX Gold Beach Cricket Official site
 History
  The Aussie Beer Baron
 Australian Beers Page

Kirin Group
Australian beer brands
Culture of Brisbane
Culture of Queensland
Milton, Queensland